The execution of Nathaniel Woods occurred on March 5, 2020, at Holman Correctional Facility in Alabama. The execution was controversial due to skepticism about his culpability and the fairness of his trial. Woods had surrendered inside a crack house during a police raid that attempted to serve a months-old arrest warrant on Woods. Another man came downstairs and opened fire, killing three officers. Woods ran from the scene after the gunfire erupted.

Despite never pulling a trigger, Woods was accused of being an accomplice and was convicted of capital murder. The same jury voted 10–2 in favor of capital punishment.

Incident
The murders that Nathaniel Woods was convicted of took place on June 17, 2004, in Birmingham, Alabama. Four police officers: Harley Chishom III, Charles Bennett, Carlos Owen and Michael Collins, stormed a crack house while Nathaniel Woods and Kerry Spencer were inside. Spencer had an SKS rifle when he heard the officers, while Woods was in the kitchen. After Woods had surrendered to the officers, Spencer came downstairs to see two officers pointing guns at him. Spencer fired shots at all four police officers, killing three out of the four (Chishom, Bennett and Owen). The fourth officer, Michael Collins, was injured but survived. Woods ran out of the house when he heard the gunshots. Spencer and Woods were both charged with the murders, despite Woods never firing a weapon. 

Spencer stated Woods was not involved and said, "Nate is absolutely innocent. That man didn't know I was going to shoot anybody just like I didn't know I was going to shoot anybody that day, period."

Trial
Kerry Spencer was tried slightly before Woods and was convicted of murder, with his trial finishing in September 2005. Spencer was sentenced to death, and remains on death row at Holman Correctional Facility awaiting execution as of 2022. Before Woods' trial, he turned down a plea deal of 20 to 25 years in prison. One of his lawyers misinformed him by saying that he could not be given the death penalty as he did not commit the murders. Lauren Faraino, a lawyer and later supporter of Woods criticized his original legal team as being weak and ineffective.

At Woods's trial, despite the city being majority black, only two black jurors were impaneled on the jury due to peremptory challenges from the prosecution of other black jurors. The prosecution conceded that it was Spencer who had opened fire on the officers, but accused Woods of luring them to their deaths while refusing to cooperate with a valid arrest warrant.

Woods was convicted of four counts of capital murder; while there were only three fatalities, one count of capital murder was added for the murder of more than one person. The prosecution presented a letter that Woods had sent to Chisholm's widow, where Woods maintained that he was innocent and that he "did not give a damn" what she and other family members thought. Woods took the stand in his own defense, but rather than offer contrition or commiserate the sorrow of the victim's family's loss as his lawyers had advised him, he instead claimed he had "no feeling about the officers" and that if they needed to take his blood, "so be it". A juror interviewed afterward was surprised by Woods' testimony at sentencing. The jury voted 10–2 in favor of capital punishment. Unlike most states that allow capital punishment, Alabama does not require death sentence verdicts to be unanimous, and Woods was placed on death row.

Controversy and execution
In an open letter, Spencer defended Woods, writing, "Nathaniel Woods doesn't even deserve to be incarcerated, much less executed," taking responsibility for the deaths himself. Spencer also stated that "Nate is absolutely innocent. That man didn't know I was going to shoot anybody just like I didn't know I was going to shoot anybody that day, period."

Bubba Cooper, an associate of Spencer and Woods and the cousin of Woods, later filed an affidavit in 2012 that said that two of the Birmingham police officers involved were crooked cops. According to Cooper, Kerry Spencer and him paid the officers around $1,000 a week in exchange for being allowed to deal and advance notice of buy-and-bust operations of narcotics officers. After Cooper was arrested on attempted murder charges after he was involved in a shoot-out, the deal fell apart after the officers allegedly raised the price. Later, advocates for Woods claim that this raises questions over whether the drug bust was entirely legitimate.

Days before Woods's execution, controversy started regarding Woods's sentence and whether he was genuinely guilty of the murders. Some civil rights leaders, including Martin Luther King III, urged Alabama governor Kay Ivey to commute his death sentence. Ivey told Woods's attorney she denied his request for clemency, arguing that he was an "integral participant in the intentional murder of these three officers", and calling him a "known drug dealer." Ivey also pointed out that over the 15 years that Woods had spent on death row, his conviction had been reviewed "at least nine times", with no court finding any reason to overturn the jury's decision.

Opinions on Woods from family members of the deceased officers are mixed; Kimberly Chisholm Simmons, the sister of deceased officer Harley Chisholm III, defended Woods in a documentary about Woods's case and believes in his innocence, and had called Governor Ivey to request clemency for Woods, saying, "He didn’t kill my brother, and he didn’t kill the other officers, may they rest in peace. I'm asking for mercy, and I believe my brother would want me to take a stance because of the man he was." On the contrary, Andrea Elders, the daughter of deceased officer Carlos Owen, believes Woods was "the whole entire reason" that the murders occurred.

Hours before Woods's death, the United States Supreme Court temporarily halted the execution, but later denied a stay. Nathaniel Woods was executed at Holman Correctional Facility by lethal injection at 9:01 p.m on March 5, 2020. He did not make a final statement. Shaun King called the execution "a modern day lynching" and said that the state of Alabama "just executed an innocent man." On March 13, 2020, Nathaniel Woods's sister, Pamela Woods, confronted Governor Kay Ivey during one of Ivey's press briefings and said, "Governor Ivey, you killed my brother."

Ivey responded to critics, claiming, "...he later bragged about his participation in these horrific murders. As such, the jury did not view Woods’ acts as those of an innocent bystander; they believed that he was a fully engaged participant."

Woods's execution made him the 67th death row prisoner to be executed in Alabama since 1978. Martin Luther King III criticized the execution, writing, "the actions of the U.S. Supreme Court and the Governor of the State of Alabama are reprehensible and have potentially contributed to an irreversible injustice". Further criticism came from Kim Kardashian, who had championed Woods's case, commenting after the stay of execution was lifted, "My heart and prayers are with Nate and his family."

During Woods's trial, his state appointed appellate lawyer abandoned him and failed to file a brief on his behalf, consequently preventing the Alabama Supreme Court from reviewing his case. Woods did not learn of this until months after the deadline to file had passed. When new counsel petitioned the Alabama Supreme Court, and later the United States Supreme Court, both courts refused. Some have argued that by denying Woods an opportunity to file a brief, he was denied his constitutional rights.

Steve Marshall, the Attorney General of Alabama, said Woods was not innocent and said his punishment was just. "The only injustice in the case of Nathaniel Woods is that which was inflicted on those four policemen that terrible day."

Robert Dunham, executive director of the Death Penalty Information Center, has criticized Alabama's policy of allowing death sentences without a unanimous decision, saying that it, "creates a heightened risk that an innocent person will be sentenced to death". Randy Susskind, deputy director of the Equal Justice Initiative, has also criticized the policy, commenting, "Historically, unanimity has been a hallmark of our jury system", adding that in death penalty cases, the state being unable to convince the entire jury beyond a reasonable doubt "is a pretty important factor".

2021 documentary

On December 3, 2021, a documentary by The New York Times about the case of Nathaniel Woods titled To Live and Die in Alabama was released on Hulu and FX.

See also 
 Brandon Bernard
 Dustin Higgs
 List of people executed in Alabama
 List of people executed in the United States in 2020

Notes

References 

1976 births
2020 deaths
21st-century executions by Alabama
21st-century executions of American people
21st-century African-American people
People executed by Alabama by lethal injection
American people convicted of assault
American people executed for murdering police officers
People convicted of murder by Alabama
2020 in American law
2020 in Alabama
2020 controversies in the United States
Deaths by person in Alabama
Executed people from Alabama
March 2020 events in the United States
Executed African-American people